Woodhey High School is a coeducational secondary school in Ramsbottom, in the Metropolitan Borough of Bury, Greater Manchester, England.

Woodhey High School was built by Bury LEA (Local Education Authority) in 1979 to replace the Peel Brow Secondary Modern school. Previously a community school administered by Bury Metropolitan Borough Council, in October 2020 Woodhey High School converted to academy status. The school is now sponsored by the Shaw Education Trust.

Location
Woodhey High School is located near towns such as Bury, Bolton, Ramsbottom and Tottington and the suburbs of Brandlesholme, Greenmount and Edenfield and Rawtenstall. The address is: Woodhey High School, Bolton Road West, Ramsbottom, Bury, BL0 9QZ. The school has had major building work and renovation work that included several new classrooms and facilities around the school such as a recording studio.

Education
Secondary education is provided at Woodhey High School for 11- to 16-year-olds (Years 7 to 11). 
Many subjects are available to study at Woodhey including: 
Art, 
English Literature, 
English Language, 
Maths, 
(Double Award) Science (including Biology, 
Chemistry,
Physics), 
History, 
Geography, 
Music, 
Information Technology, 
Business Studies, 
Electronics, 
French, 
Spanish, 
Personal Social Health Citizenship Education, 
Film Studies, Computer Science, Child Development and 
Physical Education.

Notable former pupils
Antony Cotton, actor who plays Sean Tully in Coronation Street
Kelvin Lomax, footballer, most recently played for Hyde United
Kieran Trippier, footballer currently playing for Newcastle United and brother of Kelvin Lomax
John Sharples (footballer, born 1973), played for Manchester United and York City
Nat Taylor (footballer), currently playing for Ramsbottom United

References

External links

 Woodhey High School official website

Secondary schools in the Metropolitan Borough of Bury
Academies in the Metropolitan Borough of Bury
Educational institutions established in 1979
1979 establishments in England
Ramsbottom
Shaw Education Trust